Mesnil-Roc'h is a commune in the Ille-et-Vilaine department in Brittany in northwestern France. It was established on 1 January 2019 by merger of the former communes of Saint-Pierre-de-Plesguen (the seat), Lanhélin and Tressé.

Population

See also
Communes of the Ille-et-Vilaine department

References

Communes of Ille-et-Vilaine

Communes nouvelles of Ille-et-Vilaine
Populated places established in 2019
2019 establishments in France